Salina mulcahyae is a species of elongate-bodied springtails in the family Paronellidae.

References

Collembola

Animals described in 1980